The A4 highway is a highway in Nigeria. It is a north–south route from the south coast to inland in the east of the country.

It runs from Calabar near the coast through Ikom in Cross River State;  Katsina Ala in Benue State; Uto in Akwa Ibom State; Wukari in Taraba State; and Numan in Adamawa State — to join the A3 highway near Maiduguri in Borno State.

It also runs from Odukpani in Cross River State through Akwa Ibom State to the Southeast and Southwest of Nigeria

See also

Highways in Nigeria
Adamawa State
Akwa Ibom State
Benue State
Borno State
Cross River State
Taraba State